A Yaranga (Chukchi: Яраӈы, Yarangy) is a tent-like traditional mobile home of some nomadic Northern indigenous peoples of Russia, such as Chukchi and Siberian Yupik.

A Yaranga is a cone-shaped or rounded reindeer-hide tent. It is built of a light wooden frame covered with reindeer skins or canvas sewn together.

The word yaranga comes from the Chukchi word for house: jaraŋə (Cyrillic: яраӈы). In Russian use, the terms chum, yurt and yaranga may be used interchangeably.

Chauchu Chukchi   

It is built of a light wooden frame covered with reindeer skins sewn together. A medium-size yaranga requires about 50 skins.

A large yaranga is hard to completely heat up. There is a smaller cabin called a polog built inside it, that can be kept warm and cozy.

Siberian Yupik and Anqallyt Chukchi 
The most numerous of the Siberian Yupik peoples, the Chaplino Eskimos (Ungazigmit) had a round, dome-shaped building for winter. Literature refers to it as a "yaranga", the same term which the Chukchi people use, but the term used in the Chaplino Eskimos' language is mengteghaq (extended Cyrillic: мыӈтыӷаӄ). Its framework was made of posts. Tarpaulins were used for covering the framework. The yaranga was surrounded by sod or planking around the base. There was a smaller cabin within the yaranga at the rear, used for sleeping and living. It was separated from the outer, cooler parts of the yaranga with haired reindeer skins and grass, supported by a cage-like framework. In the language of Chaplino Eskimos, it was called , a word borrowed from the Chukchi language. Household duties were done in the larger outer room of the yaranga in front of this inner building. In winter storms, and also at night, the dogs were there. This room for economical purposes was called .

See also 

 Tipi
 Lavvu

Notes

References

Latin

Cyrillic 

  The transliteration of author's name, and the rendering of title in English:

External links 

 
  Rendering in English: Ungazik settlement, Kunstkamera, Russian Academy of Sciences. Old photos about former life of a Siberian Yupik settlement, including those of a various house types, both inside and outside.
 
 Photographic collection of A.S.Forshtein in the Peter the Great Museum of Anthropology and Ethnography (Kunstkamera), Russian Academy of Sciences

House types
Portable buildings and shelters
Tents
Yupik culture
Siberian Yupik